The Sony Ericsson S500i is a mobile phone manufactured by Sony Ericsson. The phone was announced in May 2007 and released in the 3rd quarter of 2007.

It is a slim slider phone, measuring 99 x 47 x 14 mm and weighing about 94 grams with its Li-Ion battery. It has 12.0 MB of internal memory, which can be expanded with a Memory Stick Micro. It includes a 2.0-megapixel camera with 4X zoom, and it provides video recording, streaming, and viewing. The music player can play AAC, AAC+, eAAC+ and MP3 files. The phone also has support for EDGE, GPRS and Bluetooth.

One feature is that the UI and external lights changes color depending on the time of day, day of the week or with the seasons. The largest women's magazine in Switzerland, annabelle, and Orange Switzerland are releasing the S500 as a fashion mobile phone which is specially targeted at women.  This package features the S500 together with other fashionable accessories such as a lanyard.

References

External links
Details of S500i at GSMArena
Tutorial to convert a regular S500i to a W580i 

S500i
Mobile phones introduced in 2007